Eagle is a city in the western United States in Ada County, Idaho,  northwest of downtown Boise. The population was 30,346 at the time of the 2020 census.

Geography

Climate
This region experiences warm to hot, dry summers, and cold, dry winters averaging  of snow, with summer high temperatures averaging  and winter low temperatures averaging . According to the Köppen climate classification system, Eagle has a "Csb" on climate maps.

Demographics

2020 census
At the 2020 census there were 30,346 people, 10,610 households, and 8,293 families living in the city. The racial makeup of the city was 91.1% White, 0.4% African American, 0.5% Native American, 1.8% Asian, 0.2% Pacific Islander, 1.8% from other races, and 4.9% from two or more races. Hispanic or Latino of any race were 7.6%.

Of the 10,610 households 33.4% had children under the age of 18 living with them, 68.9% were married couples living together, 19.5% had a female householder with no husband present, 8.5% had a male householder with no wife present, and 19.8% were non-families. 13.8% of households were one person and 8.8% were one person aged 65 or older. The average household size was 2.65 and the average family size was 3.04.

The median age was 41.6 years. 25.4% of residents were under the age of 18; 5.5% were between the ages of 18 and 24; 19.4% were from 25 to 44; 30.3% were from 45 to 64; and 20.9% were 65 or older. The gender makeup of the city was 48.2% male and 51.8% female.

The median household income was $91,414 and the median family income was $107,607. Males had a median income of $65,625 versus $45,787 for females. The per capita income for the city was $51,917. About 5.3% of families and 6.7% of the population were below the poverty line, including 5.3% of those under age 18 and 7.1% of those age 65 or over.

2010 census
At the 2010 census there were 19,908 people, 7,069 households, and 5,585 families living in the city. The racial makeup of the city was 94.4% White, 0.3% African American, 0.5% Native American, 1.6% Asian, 0.1% Pacific Islander, 1.0% from other races, and 2.0% from two or more races. Hispanic or Latino of any race were 4.7%.

Of the 7,069 households 41.5% had children under the age of 18 living with them, 67.9% were married couples living together, 7.9% had a female householder with no husband present, 3.2% had a male householder with no wife present, and 21.0% were non-families. 17.7% of households were one person and 8.5% were one person aged 65 or older. The average household size was 2.82 and the average family size was 3.20.

The median age was 40.6 years. 30.8% of residents were under the age of 18; 5.4% were between the ages of 18 and 24; 21.3% were from 25 to 44; 30.3% were from 45 to 64; and 12.1% were 65 or older. The gender makeup of the city was 49.1% male and 50.9% female.

2000 census
At the 2000 census there were 11,085 people, 3,864 households, and 3,098 families living in the city. The racial makeup of the city was 95.90% White, 0.37% African American, 0.47% Native American, 0.74% Asian, 0.13% Pacific Islander, 0.59% from other races, and 1.80% from two or more races. Hispanic or Latino of any race were 2.63%.

Of the 3,864 households 45.9% had children under the age of 18 living with them, 69.4% were married couples living together, 7.6% had a female householder with no husband present, and 19.8% were non-families. 16.1% of households were one person and 5.3% were one person aged 65 or older. The average household size was 2.87 and the average family size was 3.23.

The age distribution was 32.6% under the age of 18, 5.6% from 18 to 24, 31.1% from 25 to 44, 23.1% from 45 to 64, and 7.6% 65 or older. The median age was 35 years. For every 100 females, there were 100.7 males. For every 100 females aged 18 and over, there were 95.5 males.

The median household income was $65,313 and the median family income was $71,907. Males had a median income of $50,962 versus $29,066 for females. The per capita income for the city was $27,226. About 4.0% of families and 3.8% of the population were below the poverty line, including 4.9% of those under age 18 and 3.5% of those age 65 or over.

Education
Most of Eagle is in the West Ada School District (Meridian Joint School District 2), with a small portion in the Boise School District.

The Boise schools portion is zoned to: Shadow Hills Elementary School, Riverglen Middle School, and Capital High School

Pop culture
The 2008 NBC reality television show The Baby Borrowers was filmed in Eagle. Eagle also served as a filming location for the 1980 film Bronco Billy.

Notable people
 Larry Craig, former U.S. Senator from Idaho; lived in Eagle as of 2008
 Taylor Kelly, football player; grew up in Eagle
 George Kennedy, actor; lived in Eagle at the time of his death
 Tanner Mangum, American football quarterback
 Jeb Putzier, NFL tight end
 Derek Schouman, NFL tight end

Points of interest 
 Arboretum Park
 Eagle Island State Park
Ada/Eagle Sports Complex and Bike Park

References

External links
 

Cities in Idaho
Cities in Ada County, Idaho
Boise metropolitan area
Treasure Valley